Carroll Township is a township in O'Brien County, Iowa, USA.

History
Carroll Township was founded in 1872. It was named for Patrick Carroll, a pioneer settler.

References

Townships in O'Brien County, Iowa
Townships in Iowa